
Gmina Nowy Dwór is a rural gmina (administrative district) in Sokółka County, Podlaskie Voivodeship, in north-eastern Poland, on the border with Belarus.

Villages
Gmina Nowy Dwór contains the villages and settlements of Bieniowce, Bieniowce-Kolonia, Bobra Wielka, Butrymowce, Chilmony, Chorużowce, Chwojnowszczyzna, Chworościany, Dubaśno, Grzebienie-Kolonia, Jaginty, Koniuszki, Kudrawka, Leśnica, Nowy Dwór, Plebanowce, Ponarlica, Rogacze-Kolonia, Sieruciowce, Synkowce and Talki.

Neighbouring gminas
Gmina Nowy Dwór is bordered by the gminas of Dąbrowa Białostocka, Kuźnica, Lipsk and Sidra. It also borders Belarus.

References
Polish official population figures 2006

Nowy Dwor
Sokółka County